Coleophora pseudoditella is a moth of the family Coleophoridae. It is found in France, Germany, Italy, Austria, the Czech Republic, Slovakia, Hungary, Ukraine and southern Russia.

The larvae feed on the leaves of Crinitaria linosyris and Galatella punctata.

References

pseudoditella
Moths of Europe
Moths described in 1983